The Men's large hill team ski jumping competition for the 2002 Winter Olympics was held in Park City. It occurred on 18 February.

Results

References

Ski jumping at the 2002 Winter Olympics